It Is Not the Homosexual Who Is Perverse, But the Society in Which He Lives  is a 1971 German avant-garde film directed by Rosa von Praunheim.

The film was an emancipatory call for homosexuals to organize and fight for their freedom. It Is Not the Homosexual Who Is Perverse ... triggered the modern gay rights movement in Germany and Switzerland and also found great resonance internationally. The film became a media scandal because conservative homosexuals and heterosexuals alike rejected the demands for equality in all areas of life and the call for public solidarity.

The film premiered at the 1971 Berlin International Film Festival. The US premiere took place in 1972 at the Museum of Modern Art in New York City, the British premiere in the same year at the National Film Theatre in London.

Plot
Young Daniel from the province comes to Berlin and meets Clemens. Both experience great love, move in together and try to copy the bourgeois marriage. After four months they separate, as Daniel has meanwhile met an older, rich man, into whose villa he moves. A little later, his older friend cheats on him with another man at a music evening. For him, Daniel was only an object of lust.

Daniel starts working in a gay café, dresses in the latest fashion and quickly adapts to the ideals of the gay subculture. He likes to spend his free time at the lido and lets other gays admire him dressed only in a skimpy bathing suit. At night he goes to trendy bars and becomes more and more addicted to constantly changing partners and fleeting sex adventures. After a while, he also discovers the charms of cruising in parks and public toilets, where he also notices older homosexuals being beaten up.

Once Daniel ends up in a drag queen bar late at night, where many men meet at this time who have not yet found a partner for a sex adventure. Here he meets Paul, who takes him to his gay flat-sharing community.

The residents discuss the challenges and problems of gay life with him and make it clear that he leads a superficial life. His task as an emancipated gay man, they say, is to publicly acknowledge his gayness and actively stand up for other values and contents of homosexual life than just chasing fashion trends and fast, mostly anonymous sex. The group suggests that he get involved socially and politically with them, create networks and fight together with others for a fairer society in which homosexuals can develop freely and without discrimination.

Gay emancipatory, socially critical and provocative comments were placed under the plot.

Reception
The film was attacked both by German conservatives, progressives and gay activists. Despite not being a very good film, according to Samuel Clowes Huneke, it was revolutionary by conceiving homosexuality as a political identity. The film also spawned dozens of homosexual activism groups, to the left of older homophile organizations.

"Rosa von Praunheim is one of the world's most prolific gay filmmakers. His 1970 [1971] film It's Not the Homosexual Who is Perverse, But the Society in Which He Lives (Nicht der Homosexuelle ist pervers, sondern die Situation, in der er lebt) established him as the public trailblazer for the modern gay rights movement." (Academy of Arts) "It is a personal liberation for Holger Mischwitzky [Rosa von Praunheim] - and a wake-up call for all homosexual men. [...] With this film, Rosa von Praunheim becomes the icon of the gay and lesbian movement in Germany almost overnight." (Deutsche Welle) "Rosa von Praunheim's film made an epoch." (Frankfurter Rundschau)  "Praunheim became the speaksperson of moved gays. Hardly any program which was concerned about the gay cause did not want to be without his presence." (Gay Museum) The American film critic Joe Hoeffner wrote in an article about the twelve most important queer films: "Many films have been called revolutionary, but It Is Not the Homosexual… truly earns that description. The breakout film by director and activist Rosa von Praunheim (aka Holger Mischwitzky) became a foundational text of the German gay rights movement, and its call for liberation reverberated through the history of queer cinema.“

The American LGBT activist and film historian Vito Russo wrote in a public letter to Rosa von Praunheim on the occasion of the film's upcoming US premiere: "[…] Your film deserves to be shown here in America. The gay and straight community alike here must be made aware that these things are being discussed and presented elsewhere in the world. It is only through constant exposure and expression that we can ever hope to overcome what has for so many years, for too many years, been an irrational taboo. When people spend their lives fighting for a cause in which they believe, it gives them immeasurable comfort to know that there are others fighting for freedom of expression both in their lives and in their art." (Signed February 18, 1972, kept in the MoMA Archive)

Notes

References
 Halle, Randall.  "From Perverse to Queer: Rosa von Praunheim's Films in the Liberation Movements of the Federal Republic", in German Cinema since Unification, ed. David Clarke (New York: Continuum, 2006), 

 Kuzniar, Alice A, The Queer German Cinema, Stanford University Press, 2000, 
Murray, Raymond. Images in the Dark: An Encyclopedia of Gay and Lesbian Film and Video. TLA Publications, 1994,

External links

1971 films
1971 LGBT-related films
German LGBT-related films
West German films
Films set in Berlin
Films directed by Rosa von Praunheim
1970s German-language films
1970s German films